The Simcoe Foresters was an infantry regiment of the Non-Permanent Active Militia of the Canadian Militia (now the Canadian Army). In 1936, the regiment was amalgamated with The Grey Regiment to form The Grey and Simcoe Foresters.

Lineage

The Simcoe Foresters 

 Originated on 14 September 1866, in Barrie, Canada West, as the 35th Simcoe Battalion of Infantry
 Redesignated on 5 April 1867, as the 35th Battalion The Simcoe Foresters
 Redesignated on 8 May 1900, as the 35th Regiment Simcoe Foresters
 Redesignated on 1 May 1920, as The Simcoe Foresters
 Amalgamated on 15 December 1936, with The Grey Regiment and Redesignated as The Grey and Simcoe Foresters

Perpetuations 

 157th Battalion (Simcoe Foresters), CEF
 177th Battalion (Simcoe Foresters), CEF

Organization

35th Simcoe Battalion of Infantry (14 September 1866) 

 No. 1 Company (Barrie) (first raised on 27 December 1855 as the Barrie Volunteer Militia Rifle Company)
 No. 2 Company (Collingwood) (first raised on 13 November 1856 as The First Volunteer Militia Rifle Company of Collingwood)
 No. 3 Company (Cookstown) (first raised on 19 December 1861 as The 1st Volunteer Militia Rifle Company of Cookstown)
 No. 4 Company (Bradford) (first raised on 9 January 1863 as the Bradford Volunteer Militia Company of Infantry)
 No. 5 Company (Barrie) (first raised on 9 January 1863 as the Volunteer Militia Company of Infantry of Barrie)
 No. 6 Company (Oro) (first raised on 8 June 1866 as the Oro Company of Infantry)
 No. 7 Company (Orillia) (first raised on 8 June 1866 as the Orillia Company of Infantry)

The Simcoe Foresters (15 December 1920) 

 1st Battalion (perpetuating the 157th Battalion, CEF)
 2nd (Reserve) Battalion (perpetuating the 177th Battalion, CEF)

Battle honours

North West Rebellion 

 North West Canada, 1885

Great War 

 Arras, 1917, '18
 Hill 70
 Ypres, 1917
 Amiens
 Hindenburg Line
 Pursuit to Mons

Notable members 

 Major-General Sir Sam Steele 
 Lieutenant-Colonel William Edward O'Brien: Commanding officer of the York and Simcoe Provisional Battalion during the North-West Rebellion
 Major Sir Daniel Hunter McMillan 
 Flight Lieutenant Alfred B. Thompson

Notes and references 

Former infantry regiments of Canada
Military units and formations of Ontario